Bidushi Dash Barde ( 1989 – October 2012) was an Indian actress and model based in Mumbai. She was second runner-up in the 2006 "Miss Chennai" beauty pageant. She had appeared in a few Tamil films, including the 2006 crime-thriller Vettaiyaadu Vilaiyaadu. The 23-year-old was found dead in her Andheri (West) apartment on 22 October 2012. Her death, caused by excessive bleeding, is the subject of a murder investigation.

References 

1980s births
2012 deaths
Indian film actresses
Actresses in Tamil cinema
Actresses from Mumbai
Actresses from Odisha
Deaths from bleeding
21st-century Indian actresses
Female models from Odisha
Female models from Mumbai